William Tonji N'Gounou (born 31 July 1983) is a Nigerien retired footballer who played as a striker.

Club career
N'Gounou played for Kadji Sports Academy, AS FAN, FC Rosengård, IF Limhamn Bunkeflo and KSF Prespa Birlik.

International career
He made his international debut for Niger in 2011, and appeared for them in FIFA World Cup qualification matches.

He was selected for the 2012 Africa Cup of Nations, scoring Niger's first ever and to date, only, goal in tournament history versus Tunisia in 1–2 loss.

References

1983 births
Living people
People from Niamey
Nigerien footballers
Niger international footballers
Kadji Sports Academy players
AS FAN players
FC Rosengård 1917 players
IF Limhamn Bunkeflo (men) players
KSF Prespa Birlik players
Association football forwards
2012 Africa Cup of Nations players
2013 Africa Cup of Nations players
Nigerien expatriate footballers
Nigerien expatriate sportspeople in Cameroon
Expatriate footballers in Cameroon
Nigerien expatriate sportspeople in Sweden
Expatriate footballers in Sweden